Cyril Miranda (born 25 March 1985) is a retired  French cross-country skier who made his World Cup debut in 2007. At the 2010 Winter Olympics in Vancouver, he finished seventh in the team sprint, 16th in the individual sprint, and 38th in the 50 km events.

Miranda's best finish at the FIS Nordic World Ski Championships was fifth in the team sprint event at Liberec in 2009.

His best World Cup finish was fifth twice with one in 2008 in Sweden and the other in 2009 in Canada.

Cross-country skiing results
All results are sourced from the International Ski Federation (FIS).

Olympic Games

World Championships

World Cup

Season standings

References

External links
 
 
 
 

1985 births
Cross-country skiers at the 2010 Winter Olympics
Cross-country skiers at the 2014 Winter Olympics
French male cross-country skiers
Living people
Olympic cross-country skiers of France
Université Savoie-Mont Blanc alumni
21st-century French people